Cockayne is an isolated hamlet in North Yorkshire, England. It is the largest settlement in the civil parish of Bransdale, in the North York Moors national park.

Cockayne is at the head of Bransdale, a southward facing valley cut into the moors. The hamlet is the furthest north that can be travelled in the dale by vehicle (apart from a track through the plantation north of the hamlet).

Bransdale Lodge (or Cockayne Lodge) is a house built in the mid 19th century and once used by the Earl of Feversham as a shooting lodge. The small church of St Nicholas, now a grade II listed building, was built about 1800 as a chapel of ease in the ancient parish of Kirkby Moorside.

The hamlet is, with the exception of the Church and Glebe, entirely owned by the National Trust. The overwhelming part of the  Bransdale estate was transferred to the National Trust through National Land Fund procedures in 1972 and comprises all the farmland and a small amount of woodland in the valley.

Studies carried out on the heather moorland at Cockayne Head and Ridge have shown that repairing the moorland after major fires helps prevent flooding in times of heavy rain. When the moorland is burnt the peat dries out and flakes, but when the peat is allowed to grow back, it acts like a natural sponge to retain water and release it slowly over days and weeks, which helps to prevent flooding further downstream.

Gallery

References

External links

Hamlets in North Yorkshire